Ivo Ghezze (4 March 1941 – 27 December 1993) was an Italian ice hockey player. He competed in the men's tournament at the 1964 Winter Olympics.

References

External links
 

1941 births
1993 deaths
Olympic ice hockey players of Italy
Ice hockey players at the 1964 Winter Olympics
People from Cortina d'Ampezzo
Sportspeople from the Province of Belluno